Abrek Zaur is a 1926 Soviet silent Red Western directed by Boris Mikhin. The film's sets were designed by the art director Isaak Makhlis.

Synopsis
The picture is set in the mid 19th century. Highlander Zaur-Bek is accused of murdering a Russian officer "outside the law" and becomes an abrek. His house is burned, father and sister arrested. But abrek Zaur remains elusive. To force him to surrender the tsarist authorities decide to burn Zaur's native village.

Cast
 Vladimir Bestaev 
 Aleksandre Takaishvili
 N. Aganbekova 
 N. Gantarina 
 Nikoloz Sanishvili 
 Vladimir Kriger 
 G. Chegelashvili 
 D. Kusov 
 V. Rogovskaya 
 Anya Vasilyeva

References

Bibliography 
 Christie, Ian & Taylor, Richard. The Film Factory: Russian and Soviet Cinema in Documents 1896–1939. Routledge, 2012.

External links 
 

1926 films
1926 Western (genre) films
Ostern films
1920s Russian-language films
Soviet silent feature films
Soviet drama films
Soviet action films
Soviet adventure films
Soviet black-and-white films
Silent Western (genre) films
Silent drama films
Silent adventure films